June Bøttger (born 2 June 1994) is a Norwegian handball player, who plays for Aarhus United Elitehåndbold.

References

1994 births
Living people
Norwegian female handball players